The Golden Gramophone Award is a yearly national Russian music award, established by Russian Radio in 1996. The awardee receives a gold-colored figurine of a gramophone.

Recipients

References

External links

 

Awards established in 1996
Russian music awards